Nuestra Belleza Michoacán 2011,  was held in the Plaza Morelos of Uruapan, Michoacán on June 30, 2011. At the conclusion of the final night of competition, Edna Álvarez of Nueva Italia was crowned the winner. Álvarez was crowned by outgoing Nuestra Belleza Michoacán titleholder, Karla Paulina Gutiérrez. Eight contestants competed for the title.

Results

Placements

Background Music
Reily

Contestants

References

External links
Official Website

Nuestra Belleza México